The Morehouse Parish Courthouse, at 100 East Madison Avenue in Bastrop in Morehouse Parish, Louisiana, is a Beaux Arts-style building which was built in 1914.  It was listed on the National Register of Historic Places on December 27, 2002.

It is a three-story monumental building on a half-story-high basement, with beige brick veneer walls and a four-stage dome.

The building was expanded with small side wings in 1935 and expanded much further in 1966 with larger side wings that doubled the building's size, but the central block remains prominent.

See also
National Register of Historic Places listings in Morehouse Parish, Louisiana

References

Courthouses on the National Register of Historic Places in Louisiana
Beaux-Arts architecture in Louisiana
Government buildings completed in 1914
Morehouse Parish, Louisiana
Courthouses in Louisiana